KLMO-FM (98.9 FM) is a radio station broadcasting a Tejano format. Licensed to Dilley, Texas, United States, the station serves the San Antonio area.  The station is currently owned by Dilley Broadcasters.

History
The station was assigned the call letters KMOA on 2000-06-21.  On 2000-10-27, the station changed its call sign to the current KLMO.

References

External links

Mexican-American culture in San Antonio
LMO-FM
LMO-FM
Tejano music